David Robert Dawson (born 7 September 1982) is an English actor. He has had a varied career on television, including roles in The Road to Coronation Street (2010), series 2 of Luther (2011), Ripper Street (2012–2016), The Secret Agent (2016), as King Alfred in The Last Kingdom (2015–2018), and as Joseph Merrick ("The Elephant Man") in Year of the Rabbit (2019).

On stage, Dawson received a Laurence Olivier Award nomination for playing Smike in the 2007 production of The Life and Adventures of Nicholas Nickleby. Other notable performances have been in the 2009 production of Comedians, the 2010 production of Posh, and the 2011 production of Luise Miller.

Early life
Dawson was born in Widnes, England, and attended Fairfield High School and Warrington Collegiate Institute before being accepted to RADA on the acting programme in 2002. Whilst at secondary school he was a member of the Musketeer Theatre Company where he played Dogberry in William Shakespeare's Much Ado About Nothing amongst other roles. At 17 he wrote a play called Divorced and Desperate which ran at the Queen's Hall Theatre, Widnes, for three nights. A year later he wrote and starred in the play The Boy in the Bed at the Tower Theatre, Islington, with financial backing from Barbara Windsor and Julie Walters to whom he had written for help. Dawson has a younger brother, James.

Roles
After leaving RADA in 2005, Dawson's first professional role was as understudy to Kevin Spacey as the eponymous hero of Shakespeare's Richard II for Trevor Nunn.

Dawson has appeared in the television shows Doc Martin, The Thick of It, Secret Diary of a Call Girl and Peaky Blinders. He played Harry Parr-Davies in the BBC drama Gracie! about the life of English singer Gracie Fields. He starred as Coronation Street creator Tony Warren in the BBC drama The Road to Coronation Street. He played Toby Kent in three episodes of the second series of Luther for the BBC.

In 2012, Dawson appeared in two BBC Two literary adaptations, playing Bazzard in The Mystery of Edwin Drood and Poins in The Hollow Crown. He later appeared in the first three BBC-produced series of Ripper Street. In 2016, he appeared in the BBC One's version of The Secret Agent. Dawson portrayed David Collins in the BBC Two series Banished
and King Alfred in BBC America and BBC Two's historical drama series The Last Kingdom.

Dawson starred alongside Harry Styles and Emma Corrin in the 2022 film My Policeman, with critics praising his performance.

Personal life 
Dawson is gay and part of the LGBTQ community.

Theatre

Filmography

Radio

Awards
In 2008 Dawson was nominated for Best Newcomer in a Play at the Olivier Awards for his role as Smike in Nicholas Nickleby. He was also nominated in 2010 for Best Supporting Actor in the What's On Stage awards for his role as Gethin Price in Comedians.

Critical acclaim
Dawson drew critical acclaim for his portrayal of writer Tony Warren in the BBC Four drama The Road to Coronation Street. For the New Statesman Rachel Cooke wrote: "I think he's going to be a huge star. When he is doing his thing, it is hard to take your eyes off him". The Daily Express said "It is David Dawson and some perfectly judged dialogue which brings this drama to light" while The Mirror's Jane Simon called him "absolutely brilliant".

References

External links

 
 Dawson's CV at United Agents

1982 births
Living people
English male stage actors
English male television actors
English male radio actors
English gay actors
English LGBT actors
Male actors from Cheshire
People from Widnes
Alumni of RADA
English male Shakespearean actors